Všepadly is a municipality and village in Domažlice District in the Plzeň Region of the Czech Republic. It has about 40 inhabitants.

History
The first written mention of Všepadly is from 1379.

Gallery

References

Villages in Domažlice District